was a Japanese professional baseball pitcher. He played five seasons in Nippon Professional Baseball, all for the Nippon Ham Fighters. He was selected out of Akita Prefectural Honjō High School as the second overall pick in the 1978 NPB draft, and made his professional debut that season, becoming the fastest player to ever make his Japanese professional debut. He went 20-4, leading the league in wins in 1982. He died of liver failure in Akita, Akita on May 13, 2016, at the age of 55.

Personal life
He ran a sports goods store named "Kudo Sports"() in Tegatayama Nakamachi, Akita City, and after his death, his widow Michiyo has taken charge of this shop. Official gym clothes of Hiroomote Elementary School, Sakura Junior High and Joto Junior High are available here.

References

External links

1960 births
2016 deaths
Baseball people from Akita Prefecture
Japanese baseball players
Nippon Ham Fighters players
Nippon Professional Baseball pitchers
People from Yurihonjō
Sportspeople from Akita Prefecture